Steven Quale is an American film director, known for Final Destination 5 and Into the Storm, as well as his earlier work as a second unit director for James Cameron.

Filmography

Director
Darkness (1988)
Superfire (2002)
Aliens of the Deep (2005)
Final Destination 5 (2011)
Into the Storm (2014)
Renegades (2017)
Alphas (TBA)

Assistant Director
Titanic (1997) (second unit director)
The Adventures of Rocky and Bullwinkle (2000) (second unit director)
The Haunted Mansion (2003)  (second unit director)
Avatar (2009) (second unit director)
 Greyhound (2020) (second unit director)

Actor 

 Titanic (1997) (unnamed engineer who gets electrocuted)
 Pearl Harbor (2001) (Evelyn's ex-secretary)
 Secretary (2002) (Duncan)
 The Incredible Hulk (2008) (unnamed citizen)

References

External links 

English-language film directors
Special effects people
Living people
Place of birth missing (living people)
Year of birth missing (living people)